Mette Barlie (born 1964) is a Norwegian sport wrestler who represented Kolbotn IL.

She won silver medals at the 1995 and 1997 World Wrestling Championships, and has won three medals at the European championships (1996, 1997 and 1998).

References

Norwegian female sport wrestlers

Living people
1964 births
World Wrestling Championships medalists
20th-century Norwegian women
21st-century Norwegian women